Green Island Cove is a settlement in Newfoundland and Labrador.  It is close to the northern tip of the Great Northern Peninsula, and its main road link to the rest of the province is Newfoundland and Labrador Route 430.

Populated places in Newfoundland and Labrador